Scott Brant (born 14 December 1968 in Davis, California, United States) is a professional speedway rider in the United States. He is nicknamed "The Dominator". Brant began racing speedway when he was 8-years-old,

Achievements
2004- Ken Maely Cup Champion
2003- USA National Champion, Jack Milne Cup Champion, 25 Lap Classic Winner, Warren Russell Cup Champion
2002- Arrowhead Season Points Champion, Jack Milne Cup Champion, Mid-America Speedway Shootout Winner
1999- Hard Luck Award
1993- Bruce Penhall Classic Champion
1992- Southern California Best Showman
1991- Southern California Best Showman
1989- Southern California Most Promising Rider
1987- Southern California Rookie of the Year
1984- Northern California Junior Champion
1982- Northern California Junior Champion

Tracks ridden
Costa Mesa Speedway (CA), Arrowhead (CA), Ventura (CA), Victorville (CA), Glen Helen (CA), Lake Perris (CA), Auburn (CA), Cal Expo (CA), Inland Motor Speedway (CA), Ascot (South Bay) (CA), Ascot (1/4 mile) (CA), Ascot (1/2 mile) (CA), Napa (CA), Baylands (CA), Long Beach (CA), Hammerdown (NC), Fort Lauderdale (FL), Action Park (NY), Champion (NY), Indianapolis (IN), Orange Show (CA), Wild West (CA), Industry Hills (CA), Chowchilla (CA), Ken Maely's Ranch (CA), Perris Raceway (CA)

Sponsors
 Dominator Designs
 Brant Engineering
 Arai Helmets
 Russell Racing

References 

1968 births
Living people
American speedway riders
People from Davis, California